William Higgs Barker (1744–1815) was an English Hebraist.

Life
Barker was of the same family as the Hebraist Samuel Barker, and son of George Barker, tailor, of Great Russell Street, London. He was admitted on the foundation of St. Paul's School, London 10 May 1756, aged twelve. He became Pauline Exhibitioner at Trinity College, Cambridge in 1761, Perry Exhibitioner 1764–7, and took his degree of B.A. in 1765. He was also a fellow of Dulwich College, Surrey, and took holy orders.

He was elected master of Queen Elizabeth's Grammar School at Carmarthen 22 July 1767, an office which he held for the rest of his life. He was also rector of Bleddfa from 1793.

Works
He published a short work, entitled 'Grammar of the Hebrew Language adapted to the use of schools, with Biblical examples,’ 1774; and a 'Hebrew and English Lexicon,’ 1812.

References

1744 births
1815 deaths
Christian Hebraists
Alumni of Trinity College, Cambridge
18th-century English educators
Schoolteachers from London
18th-century scholars
18th-century English non-fiction writers
18th-century English male writers
18th-century English writers
English non-fiction writers
18th-century English Anglican priests
19th-century English Anglican priests
English male non-fiction writers